Eye Opener or Eyeopener may refer to:

Music
 Eyeopener, a British dance music group

Newspapers
 The Eyeopener, a weekly student newspaper at Ryerson University in Toronto, Canada
 The Eye Opener, a Socialist Party of America newspaper published in Chicago
 Calgary Eye Opener, an early-1900s Canadian newspaper founded by Bob Edwards

Television
 Eye Opener (Canadian TV series), a 1965 experimental drama television series
 Eye Opener (American TV program), a 2011-2017 syndicated morning news program
"Eye Opener", a segment on the Philippine series Eye to Eye

Other uses
 Eye Opener, a 2018 book by Dag Palovic
 Eye Opener, a rapids on the Cossatot River, Arkansas, US
 "The Eye Opener!", a marketing catchphrase for Coast soap

See also
Eyes Open (disambiguation)
Eyes Wide Open (disambiguation)
Open Your Eyes (disambiguation)